Ryde Road is an arterial road in Sydney, Australia.

Ryde Road commences at its junction with the Pacific Highway, between Pymble and Gordon. It connects through a tunnel under the Pacific Highway, to Mona Vale Road. Ryde Road runs to the south-west across a gully, and then to the south, through the suburb of West Pymble. Ryde Road terminates at the intersection of Lady Game Drive, and adjacent to the De Burghs Bridge crossing the Lane Cove River, where the A3 continues as Lane Cove Road.

Ryde Road forms the only road connection between the Ku-ring-gai and Ryde local government areas, and is one of only four road crossings of the Lane Cove River. It is often a traffic bottleneck.

Ryde Road was built in the early 1900s, after the first bridge was built across the steep valley formed by the Lane Cove River. Its name was derived from the simple fact that it leads to Ryde. In 1964, it was designated as a part of 'Ring Road 3' (later becoming Metroad 3 and A3). A new six-lane high-level bridge across the river in 1967, replacing the ricketty wooden structure and winding approaches, and Ryde Road was partly realigned and re-constructed from 2 lanes to 6 lanes to the Pacific Highway between 1967 and 1972. The grade-separation of the Pacific Highway junction, by building a tunnel under the highway and railway line connecting to Mona Vale Road, was completed in 1989.

See also

References

Streets in Sydney